Annual leave is a period of paid time off work granted by employers to employees to be used for whatever the employee wishes. Depending on the employer's policies, differing number of days may be offered, and the employee may be required to give a certain amount of advance notice, may have to coordinate with the employer to be sure that staffing is the employee's absence, and other requirements may have to be met. The vast majority of countries today mandate a minimum amount of paid annual leave by law.

Among the larger countries, China requires at least five days' paid annual leave and India requires two days of paid leave for every month worked. The United States mandates no minimum paid leave, treating it as a perk rather than a right.

Leave

Most countries have labour laws that mandate employers give a certain number of paid time-off days per year to workers. 

Canada requires at least two weeks, which increases to three weeks for employees that have worked for a certain number of years (In Saskatchewan this entitlement starts out at three weeks and increases to four weeks). An additional fourth week is provided to federally regulated workers after working for a further number of years.

In the European Union the countries can set freely the minimum, but it has to be at least equivalent to 4 working weeks. In the Netherlands this is achieved by mandating at minimum 4 times the number of contracted hours in a person's working week; e.g. if someone works 4 days of 7 hours a week, the annual leave hours a year is 112 at minimum. 

Full-time employees in Australia are entitled to at least 20 annual leave days a year.

In New Zealand, 20 days' paid leave is also the normal minimum in addition to the 11 paid statutory holidays (e.g. Christmas, New Year's Day). However, many employers offer 5 or more weeks, especially in the public sector.

Some countries, such as Denmark and Italy, or particular companies may mandate summer holidays in specific periods.

Argentina has different labour laws for public employment and private employment. Public employees have between a minimum of 21 days paid to 45 days paid for vacations (including holidays and weekends). Private employees have between a minimum of 14 paid days to 28 paid days (including holidays and weekends). In both cases are always relying on the years of service. The more years the worker has worked the more days of paid vacation they will have.

UK employers offer 28 days per annum of annual leave with a further 8 public holidays, these are referred to as Bank Holidays. Some employers may include the 8 bank holidays within their annual leave decreasing it to 20 days. 

US federal law does not require employers to grant any vacation or holidays, though, as of 2007, only about 25 percent of all employees receive no paid vacation time or paid holidays. Due to the lack of federal legislative requirements, paid leave in the US is mainly a matter of employment contracts and labor union agreements. Some jurisdictions within the US, including the states of Maine and Nevada, require paid time-off days.

According to the Bureau of Labor Statistics in the United States, the average paid holidays for full-time employees in small private establishments in 1996 was 7.6 days.

Consecutive holidays
Consecutive holidays refers to holidays that occur in a group without working days in between. In the late 1990s, the Japanese government passed a law that increased the likelihood of consecutive holidays by moving holidays from fixed days to a relative position in a month, such as the second Monday.

In New Zealand, consecutive paid holidays occur for Christmas/Boxing Day, New Year's Eve/New Year's Day, and Good Friday/Easter Monday, the last of which straddle a weekend. However, these are among 11 'statutory paid holidays' that are additional to 'paid annual leave'.

See also
 Administrative leave
 Furlough
 Holidays with Pay Convention (Revised), 1970
 List of minimum annual leave by country
 Long service leave

References

Bibliography

 
 
 

Leave of absence
Statutory law
Labour law